Claudio Poul Servetti Rodríguez (born 28 November 1994) is an Uruguayan footballer who plays as a defender for Deportes Recoleta in the Primera B de Chile.

References

External links
Profile at Football Database

1994 births
Living people
Footballers from Montevideo
Uruguayan footballers
Uruguayan expatriate footballers
Association football defenders
Rampla Juniors players
Oriental players
Deportes Recoleta footballers
Uruguayan Primera División players
Uruguayan Segunda División players
Primera B de Chile players
Uruguayan expatriate sportspeople in Chile
Expatriate footballers in Chile